West Seoul Lake Park is a park located in the southwest area of Seoul, South Korea, which opened in 2009. It won an honor award in the general design category of the 2011 American Society of Landscape Architects Professional Awards.

References

Parks in Seoul
Bodies of water of Seoul
Geography of Yangcheon District